Culbreth is a small unincorporated community in Granville County, North Carolina, United States, north of Stem.

References
 

Unincorporated communities in North Carolina
Unincorporated communities in Granville County, North Carolina